Recursive function may refer to:
Recursive function (programming), a function which references itself
General recursive function, a computable partial function from natural numbers to natural numbers
Primitive recursive function, a function which can be computed with loops of bounded length
Another name for computable function

See also
Recurrence relation, an equation which defines a sequence from initial values
Recursion theory, the study of computability

Recursion